Szymon Jarosz (born 6 March 1997) is a Polish professional footballer who plays as a centre-back.

Club career
In his career he was associated with, among others, Podbeskidzie Bielsko-Biała (then in Ekstraklasa) and Stomil Olsztyn (then in I liga). In 2018–2021, he was a player for the II liga (and then, the III liga after the 2019–20 relegation) side of Stal Stalowa Wola.

On 6 February 2021, he signed a 1,5-year contract with II liga club Olimpia Grudziądz. On 27 February, he made his debut in a 1–0 victory against Motor Lublin.

References

External links

1997 births
Living people
People from Bielsko-Biała
Polish footballers
Poland youth international footballers
Association football midfielders
Podbeskidzie Bielsko-Biała players
Stal Stalowa Wola players
Olimpia Grudziądz players
Polonia Warsaw players
Ekstraklasa players
I liga players
II liga players
III liga players